Ssangseong Prefecture was an administrative division of the Yuan dynasty established in 1258 in modern-day Kumya County, South Hamgyong Province, North Korea. It was founded as a base for conquest and domination of northern Goryeo territory together with the Dongnyeong Prefectures, which had jurisdiction over southern Jabi (Hangul:자비 Hanja:慈悲) pass. In 1356, Gongmin of Goryeo got out under the influence of Yuan dynasty, attacked Yuan dynasty together with Dongnyeong Prefectures and restored the land.

Installation 
In 1258, Yuan dynasty general San Gil (Hangul:산길 Hanja:散吉) and Bo Ji (Hangul:보지 Hanja:普只) invaded the south part of the Great Wall through east Jurchen. When they reached Hwaju state (Hangul:화주 Hanja:和州), Shin Jip-pyeong (Hangul:신집편 Hanja:慎執平) who was an officer for northeast troop lead soldiers and residents to protect Jeodo island (Hangul:저도 Hanja:楮島), but later moved to Jukdo island in Tŏkwon. However, Jo Hwi (Hangul:조휘 Hanja:趙暉) and Tak Cheong (Hangul:탁청 Hanja:卓青) killed Pak Ingi (Hangul:박인기 Hanja:朴仁起), governor of Deungju, and Kim Seonbo (Hangul:김선보 Hanja:金宣甫), governor of Hwaju, and then Shin Jip-pyeong was surrendered. They also abandoned the land north of Cheollyeong Pass (Hangul:철령 Hanja:鐵嶺) to Yuan dynasty. This incident has happened without government's order. And this is reason why Ssangseong prefecture was allocated to govern this region. At that time, Jo Hwi was nominated as a first commander and Tak Cheong was nominated as a chili arch. Afterwards, the position of commander was inherited by Jo family. After Jo Hwi, the position was inherited by Jo Ryanggi (Hangul:조량기 Hanja:趙良琪) who was the son of Jo Hwi, Jo Rim (Hangul:조림 Hanja:趙琳), grandchild of Jo Hwi and Jo Sosaeng (Hangul:조소생 Hanja:趙小生) who was a great-grandchild of Jo Hwi. The position of chiliarch was also inherited by Tak family.

On the other hand, Choe Tan who made a rebellion in 1269, devoted 54 castles including Seogyeong and 6 castles including Seohae province to Yuan dynasty. Yuan dynasty renamed Seogyeong as Dongnyeong Prefectures and incorporated to their own territory. This decision has made regardless of Yuan dynasty's invasion.

After that, Goryeo came to fall to the position of receiving the original interference.

Fall 
The fall of Ssangseong prefecture started in 1356. Ryu Inu (Hangul:류인우 Hanja:柳仁雨) who was a vice-minister of councilors became an officer for northeast troop and get command to invade Ssangseong prefecture from Gongmin of Goryeo. He was sent to the front together with general of battalion Gong Bubo (Hangul:공부보 Hanja:貢夫甫), Kim Wonbong (Hangul:김원봉 Hanja:金元鳳) and Yi Inim (Hangul:이인임 Hanja:李仁任). At that time, Jo Sosaeng who was great-grandchildren of Jo Hwi and Tak Dogyeong (Hangul:탁도경 Hanja:卓都卿) were fought back, however, Jo Don (Hangul:조돈 Hanja:趙暾) who was a grandchildren of Jo Hwi (Hangul:조휘 Hanja:趙暉) and Yi Jachun, his son Yi Seong-gye opened gate of Ssangseong prefecture by holding secret communication with Goryeo's military. Ssangseong prefecture fall and general Jo Sosaeng has escaped.

Ryu Inu established Hwaju again and recovered other areas which Ssangseong prefecture governed. The family of Yi Jachun who carried out the fall of Ssangseong prefecture was in the position of senior high official named as Darughachi or a chili arch from ancestral generations, but at that time he turned to Goryeo. He became a minister of the King of Goryeo and became an officer for northeast troop. Jo Don who was the descent of Jo Hwi (the first inspector of Ssangseong prefecture) corporate to govern Ssangseong prefecture initiatively and succeed, take rid of betrayal of his ancestors. He also advanced to the central political circle of Goryeo.

See also 
 Korea under Yuan rule
 Dongnyeong Prefectures
Tamna prefectures

References 
 , 2000
  Chikuma Shobō, 2001

South Hamgyong
History of Korea
Goryeo
Former commanderies of China in Korea
Prefectures of the Yuan dynasty